George Ciccariello-Maher (born March 12, 1979), also known as Geo Maher, is an American political scientist who was an associate professor of politics and global studies at Drexel University. After a tweet reputedly mocking the white genocide conspiracy theory and a tweet expressing support for the 1804 Haiti massacre, as well as other statements, Ciccariello-Maher was placed on administrative leave before resigning from Drexel. He claimed the resignation was due to "death threats and threats of violence."

Academic career
Ciccariello-Maher did his undergraduate work at St. Lawrence University and Cambridge University, where he was a Davies-Jackson Scholar. He then completed a master's degree at University of California, Berkeley before taking a sabbatical in Mexico. After returning he finished a Ph.D in political science from Berkeley in 2010, and was then appointed as assistant professor of politics and global studies at Drexel University in Philadelphia the same year. He was promoted to associate professor in 2016.

Ciccariello-Maher is the author of three books. His first book, We Created Chavez: A People's History of the Venezuelan Revolution, concerns Hugo Chavez's Bolivarian Revolution. He has translated books by Enrique Dussel, Immanuel Wallerstein, and Stefan Gandler, and is co-editor (with Bruno Bosteels) of the book series "Radical Américas," published by Duke University Press. He is a member of the editorial collective of Abolition: A Journal of Insurgent Politics.

Ciccariello-Maher has served as a media commentator on Venezuela's Bolivarian Revolution, Mike Brown, Freddie Gray and Philando Castile, the Ferguson unrest and 2015 Baltimore protests, and the abolition of the police.

In October 2017, he became the subject of controversy after tweeting "All I Want for Christmas is white genocide.” and "To clarify: when the whites were massacred during the Haitian Revolution, that was a good thing indeed". Following this, Drexel University placed Ciccariello-Maher on administrative leave. On December 28, Ciccariello-Maher announced his resignation from Drexel, effective December 31, citing "nearly a year of harassment by right-wing, white supremacist media outlets and Internet mobs, after death threats and threats of violence directed against me and my family."

In January 2018, Cicarriello-Maher announced on Facebook that he was now a visiting scholar at New York University's Hemispheric Institute of Performance and Politics.

Activism
While in England, Ciccariello-Maher was a member of the Cambridge collective Anti-Capitalist Action, and was later arrested during the 20 March 2003 anti-war protest known as "Day X" that marked the beginning of the 2003 invasion of Iraq. When four members were rusticated from King's College, Cambridge in 2002 for their participation in a squatted social center, Ciccariello-Maher co-authored an appeal document that resulted in their reinstatement.

Ciccariello-Maher was a member of Bring the Ruckus, co-founded by the late Joel Olson. In Oakland, he was arrested for involvement in the protests that followed the shooting death of Oscar Grant by transit officer Johannes Mehserle.

Ciccariello-Maher supports Venezuela's Bolivarian Revolution. During opposition protests in early 2014, he appeared on Democracy Now to discuss his views of protesters' support for opposition leaders like Leopoldo López. He has also been critical of those on the left and anarchists who have supported the Venezuelan opposition during those protests.

He is also a member of the Democratic Socialists of America.

Social media controversies
Ciccariello-Maher was active on social media, where his statements have created controversy, including calls for his dismissal. His writing in Salon that "Riots Work" claims that racism against white people is imaginary and that the police should be abolished. In 2015, he tweeted that a South Carolina school police officer, who lost his job after body-slamming a black female student during an arrest, should be done "like Old Yeller."

On Christmas Eve 2016, Ciccariello-Maher tweeted, "All I Want for Christmas is White Genocide," and the next day tweeted, "To clarify: when the whites were massacred during the Haitian Revolution, that was a good thing indeed" Ciccariello-Maher stated the tweet was sent in response to a racist backlash against State Farm Insurance for purportedly advancing "white genocide" by depicting an interracial couple in an advertisement.

On Christmas Day, Drexel issued a public statement distancing itself from Ciccariello-Maher's tweet:

Ciccariello-Maher responded by stating that "white genocide" is an "imaginary concept... invented by white supremacists," adding that "It is a figment of the racist imagination, it should be mocked, and I'm glad to have mocked it." He criticized Drexel's response, which "amounts to caving to the truly reprehensible movements and organizations that I was critiquing... White supremacy is on the rise, and we must fight it by any means. In that fight, universities will need to choose whether they are on the side of free expression and academic debate, or on the side of the racist mob."

Some critics dismissed the Drexel statement as a misinterpretation of the tweet, and for infringing on Ciccariello-Maher's academic freedom and due process. Hank Reichman, chair of the American Association of University Professors Committee on Academic Freedom, suggested that "Drexel should apologize to Professor Cicciariello-Maher."

Theodore Kupfer, managing editor of the National Review, criticized Ciccariello-Maher, calling him hypocritical due to statements made by him regarding people who also have made controversial statements, but are on the political right. He also cited his support for former President Hugo Chávez and current President Nicolás Maduro of Venezuela, who have been accused for violating the free speech of political opponents and the use of physical force against them.

In March 2017, Ciccariello-Maher was again criticized for tweeting that he was "trying not to vomit or yell about Mosul" when a soldier was given a seat by a passenger in first class, on a flight he was on two days after the U.S. bombing of Mosul killed 200 civilians.

Drexel's provost M. Brian Blake began an investigation into Ciccariello-Maher's communication on Twitter in April 2017.

Shortly after the 2017 Las Vegas shooting, Ciccariello-Maher posted tweets saying the mass shooting in Las Vegas, which left 59 people dead and hundreds injured, was the product of a system that favors white males. His statements, such as "It's the white supremacist patriarchy, stupid", resulted in a number of death threats. Subsequently, he wrote an op-ed for The Washington Post in which he elaborated on his tweets, stating "I tweeted before then diagnosing a sense of double entitlement—as white people and as men—that, when frustrated, can occasionally lead to violent consequences."

Books

 Spanish translation: Nosotros creamos a Chávez: Una historia popular de la revolución venezolana. Translated by Valentina Figuera.
 French translation: La révolution au Venezuela: Une histoire populaire. Translated by Étienne Dobenesque.
 Arabic translation: نحن من صنعنا تشافيز تاريخٌ شعبيٌّ للثورةِ الفنزولية. Translated by Bassam Abu-Ghazalah.

References

Citations

Bibliography

External links

 
 Appearances on Democracy Now!

Living people
1979 births
St. Lawrence University alumni
University of California, Berkeley alumni
Drexel University faculty
American political philosophers
American political scientists
People from Poland, Maine
Members of the Democratic Socialists of America
American translators
American communists
Alumni of St John's College, Cambridge